Love Song for Jeffrey is the fifth studio album by Australian-American pop singer Helen Reddy, released on March 25, 1974, by Capitol Records. The album focused on her family, giving special attention to those who had died within the past year. A tribute on the back cover reads: "In memory of my mother, Stella Lamond Reddy, July 1973, my father, Max Reddy, September 1973, and my beloved aunt, Helen Reddy Sr., January 1974."

The album debuted on the Billboard Top LPs & Tape chart in the issue dated April 20, 1974, and reached number 11 during its 35 weeks there. Six weeks later, on June 6, the Recording Industry Association of America awarded the album with Gold certification for sales of 500,000 copies in the United States, and in Canada it peaked at number six on RPM magazine's album chart in September of that year. On January 27, 2004, it was released for the first time on compact disc as one of two albums on one CD, the other album being her other 1974 release, Free and Easy.



Singles
The first track that was selected for release from this album, "Keep On Singing", was issued on February 25, 1974, debuted on Billboard'''s  Hot 100 shortly thereafter, in the issue of the magazine dated March 9, and peaked at number 15 during its 13 weeks there. Its first appearance on the magazine's Easy Listening chart came in the March 16 issue, and the song managed two of its 13 weeks on that list at number one. On the RPM singles chart it reached number 10.

"You and Me Against the World" was released as a single on May 27 of that year and got as high as number nine during its 20 weeks on the pop chart that began in the June 15 issue. That same issue also included its first appearance on the Easy Listening chart, where it stayed for 18 weeks, one of which was spent at number one. It also reached number nine on the Canadian singles chart. In the liner notes for the 2006 compilation The Woman I Am: The Definitive Collection Reddy writes of this song that it is her "second-most-requested song after 'I Am Woman'. I still receive mail from people who have lost a parent or child telling me that this was 'their song'. These letters always touch me."

Track listing
Side 1
 "That Old American Dream" (Albert Hammond, Mike Hazlewood) – 2:27
 "You're My Home" (Billy Joel) – 2:59
 "Songs" (Barry Mann, Cynthia Weil) – 3:55
 "I Got a Name" (Charles Fox, Norman Gimbel) – 3:32
 "Keep On Singing" (Bobby Hart, Danny Janssen) – 3:03
Side 2
 "You and Me Against the World" (Kenny Ascher, Paul Williams) – 3:08
 "Ah, My Sister" (Peter Allen, Carole Bayer Sager) – 3:03
 "Pretty, Pretty" (Peter Allen, Hal Hackady) – 3:26
 "Love Song for Jeffrey" (Peter Allen, Helen Reddy) – 2:40
 "Stella by Starlight" (Ned Washington, Victor Young) – 3:50

Alternate version of "Songs"

In 2009 EMI Music Special Markets released Rarities from the Capitol Vaults'', a 12-track CD of mostly what were previously unreleased Reddy recordings, which included an alternate version of "Songs".

Charts

Personnel
Helen Reddy – vocals
Tom Catalano – producer
Artie Butler – arranger and conductor (except as noted)
Michael Omartian – arranger and conductor (" Keep On Singing", "You're My Home")
Armin Steiner – engineer 
Jeff Wald – management
Virgil Mirano – cover and liner photography
Roy Kohara – art direction

Notes

References

 

1974 albums
Capitol Records albums
Helen Reddy albums
Albums produced by Tom Catalano